Me is the first full-length studio album by James McCartney. The album was produced by David Kahne and released on 4 May 2013.

James McCartney said of the album: "it's about having as much emotion as possible for me, musically and lyrically. Cathartic, heartfelt and true."

Track listing
All tracks are written by James McCartney.

"Strong As You" – 3:17
"Butterfly" – 3:46
"You & Me Individually" – 4:21
"Snap Out of It" – 3:42
"Bluebell" – 3:57
"Life's a Pill" – 3:09
"Home" – 3:44
"Thinking About Rock and Roll" – 3:26
"Wisteria" – 3:15
"Mexico" – 3:00
"Snow" – 4:57
"Virginia" (bonus track) – 3:06

Personnel 
 James McCartney – lead vocals, guitar, bass, piano, drums
 Paul McCartney – guitar, piano, drums
 Hugh Longcroft Neal – guitar, keyboards
 Jay Ledger – guitar
 Oliver McKiernan – bass guitar
 Tobias Humble – drums
 Shawn Pelton – drums
 Steven Isserlis – cello
 Kate Davis – backing vocals
 Roy Hendrickson – engineer

References 

2013 debut albums
James McCartney albums
ECR Music Group albums
Albums produced by David Kahne